This is a list of chapters and colonies of Kappa Kappa Psi (ΚΚΨ), national honorary band fraternity. Over 300 chapters have been established in the United States since 1919, which are organized into six separate districts.

Chapters 

Notes:

 An asterisk (*) next to a charter date indicates that the chapter was re-chartered on that date.
 † The Alpha Phi chapter at Rutgers University had its charter revoked in 1972 and reorganized as Mu Upsilon Alpha, which in 2007 became a chapter of Mu Beta Psi.
 Probation doesn't denote inactivity.

Chapter statuses 

There are several statuses that chapters of Kappa Kappa Psi can hold: active, inactive, investigative hold, probation, and suspension.

Active chapters are required to pay dues and fees on time, submit required reports on time, comply with the national constitution, and adhere to national risk management policies.

Investigative hold is a new status established at the 2011 National Convention which is immediately applied to chapters upon due cause, usually in the case of hazing allegations. All chapter activities and functions are halted until the conclusion of an investigation by a representative of the national fraternity, which is generally a District Governor. Previously, chapters would have been immediately placed on suspension pending investigation.

Probation is applied to chapters by the National Council upon due cause, and is accompanied by terms and conditions to correct whatever issues the chapter has. Chapters on probation may meet and conduct activities as normal unless otherwise directed by their terms. Generally, chapters are placed on probation for failing to submit required paperwork.

Suspension is reserved for serious allegations of policy violations or chapters that are frequently delinquent with paperwork. All chapter activities and functions are halted pending investigation, and after the investigation concludes, the chapter may only meet with the approval of the chapter sponsor and national president and attendance of the chapter sponsor.

If chapters continue to fail to follow the policies of the fraternity or are found to have violated the fraternity's hazing policy, the National Council may revoke the chapter's charter. Remaining collegiate members of the chapter may be expelled from the fraternity in a charter revocation. In the event of a charter revocation, the national fraternity takes measures to reclaim the chapter's charter and other fraternal regalia and equipment.

Chapters that become too small to effectively function may be placed on inactive status by the National Council. This status relieves all financial obligations of the chapter to National Headquarters and removes the chapter's voting rights at all conventions and the right to initiate members. Remaining collegiate members of the chapter are transferred to alumni membership. Any chapter that is inactive, either by charter revocation or by the above method, may be reinstated by national headquarters after inspection by the national council and a successful petition that meets the requirements of a new chapter.

Petitioning chapters

Districts 

Chapters and colonies of Kappa Kappa Psi are organized into seven districts, six of which are named for the geographical region of the United States that they represent. These are the North Central, Northeast, Midwest, Southeast, Southwest, and Western districts.

North Central District: Indiana, Illinois, Kentucky, Michigan, Ohio, and Wisconsin
Northeast District: Connecticut, Delaware, District of Columbia, Maine, Maryland, Massachusetts, New Hampshire, New Jersey, New York, Pennsylvania, Rhode Island, Vermont, Virginia, and West Virginia
Midwest District: Colorado, Iowa, Kansas, Minnesota, Missouri, Montana, Nebraska, North Dakota, South Dakota, and Wyoming
Southeast District: Alabama, Florida, Georgia, Mississippi, North Carolina, South Carolina, and Tennessee
Southwest District: Arkansas, Louisiana, New Mexico, Oklahoma, and Texas
Western District: Alaska, Arizona, California, Hawaii, Idaho, Nevada, Oregon, Utah, and Washington

The seventh district is a de jure "International District" which would contain any chapter located outside of the United States, but there are no international chapters and therefore no practical International District.

Each chapter is automatically a member of the district its state is located in, unless it appeals to the National Council to join a neighboring district. Only one chapter in the fraternity is not in its state's district: Zeta Lambda at Marshall University is in the North Central District, though it is located in West Virginia, which is in the Northeast District.

References 

chapters
Lists of chapters of United States student societies by society